The John Sargent House is a historic house located at 225 SW Clay St. in Topeka, Kansas. The house is considered to be a leading example of Gothic Revival architecture in Kansas.

Description and history 
The two-story, ell-shaped, limestone, Late Gothic Revival house was built c. 1882, and stands on a limestone foundation and is surmounted by a cross-gabled, asphalt shingled roof. A two-story, gable roof, limestone addition to the west was added c. 1910. The building has a southeast facade orientation.

It was added to the National Register of Historic Places on July 28, 1995

References

Buildings and structures in Topeka, Kansas
Gothic Revival architecture in Kansas
Houses completed in 1882
Houses on the National Register of Historic Places in Kansas
Houses in Shawnee County, Kansas
National Register of Historic Places in Topeka, Kansas